The Journal of Soil and Water Conservation is a bimonthly peer-reviewed journal of conservation science, practice, and policy. The journal is published by the Soil and Water Conservation Society. 

Earth and atmospheric sciences journals
Soil science journals